Rudolf Geilinger (6 May 1848 – 23 January 1911) was a Swiss politician, mayor of Winterthur (1879–1911) and President of the Swiss National Council (1899/1900).

Further reading

External links 
 
 

Members of the National Council (Switzerland)
Presidents of the National Council (Switzerland)
1848 births
1911 deaths